Ameghinoa is a genus of flowering plants in the family Asteraceae, described in 1897 by Carlo Luigi Spegazzini.

There is only one known species, Ameghinoa patagonica, native to the Chubut and Río Negro Provinces of Argentina.

References

Monotypic Asteraceae genera
Endemic flora of Argentina
Nassauvieae
Plants described in 1897
Taxa named by Carlo Luigi Spegazzini